Sergey Alexandrovich Syrtsov (born October 25, 1966) is a former Soviet/Russian weightlifter.

Weightlifting achievements 
 Senior world champion (1991, 1994);
 Senior European champion (1994, 1995);
 Set seven world records during his career.

References 

chidlovski.net/liftup
sports-reference.com

1966 births
Living people
Soviet male weightlifters
Russian male weightlifters
Olympic weightlifters of Russia
Olympic weightlifters of the Unified Team
Olympic silver medalists for Russia
Olympic silver medalists for the Unified Team
Weightlifters at the 1992 Summer Olympics
Weightlifters at the 1996 Summer Olympics
Olympic medalists in weightlifting
Medalists at the 1996 Summer Olympics
Medalists at the 1992 Summer Olympics